Henry Kemble (1787–1857) was a teabroker in successful partnership with his brother and Conservative Member of Parliament for East Surrey, England.

He was a retired, wealthy tea broker whose business was at St Antholin's Churchyard, Watling Street, City of London.

He was elected to the Commons in one of the two seats for East Surrey as a Conservative at the 1837 general election and was re-elected until 1847 when he stood down.

References

External links
 

UK MPs 1837–1841
UK MPs 1841–1847
Conservative Party (UK) MPs for English constituencies
1787 births
1857 deaths